Masaru Takumi (宅見 勝 Takumi Masaru; June 22, 1936 – August 28, 1997) was a powerful Japanese organized crime figure assassinated in 1997. Until his death, he was the second-in-command (wakagashira) and financial overseer of Japan's largest yakuza gang, the Yamaguchi-gumi. Known as "the man who never sleeps", he also headed his own sub-organization, the 1000-member Takumi-gumi.

Death
He was considered a likely successor to the Yamaguchi-gumi's fifth godfather, Yoshinori Watanabe, but in August 1997, Takumi was shot and killed in a coffee shop on the fourth floor of the Oriental Hotel in Kobe by members of a breakaway Yamaguchi affiliate, the Nakano-kai. An innocent bystander was killed by a stray bullet in the attack, which led to the downfall of the Nakano-kai.

Last Job
His last position at the Yamaguchi-gumi was as wakagashira (the number-two), and after his death, the wakagashira post became vacant and had been vacant until 2005 when it was succeeded by Kiyoshi Takayama. The Takumi-gumi's head position was succeeded by Tadashi Irie.

Spouse 
His mistress was the sister of Hideki Saijo  , a Japanese singer and an actor most famous for singing the Japanese version of the Village People's hit song "Y.M.C.A.", called "Young Man".

References

1936 births
1997 deaths
Japanese crime bosses
Yakuza members
People from Kobe
Yamaguchi-gumi
Murdered gangsters
Deaths by firearm in Japan
People murdered by the Yakuza
Japanese murder victims